Yeaton is a small village in Shropshire, England.

It is situated in the parish of Baschurch. The River Perry flows by to the south, and on the other side is the hamlet of Grafton.

See also
Listed buildings in Baschurch

Villages in Shropshire